Champions League 2007 may refer to:
 AFC Champions League 2007
 CAF Champions League 2007
 UEFA Champions League 2006–07
 UEFA Champions League 2007-08